Grimtooth's Traps Too is a 1982 role-playing game supplement published by Flying Buffalo's Blade division.

Contents
Grimtooth's Traps Too is a compilation that offers 101 more traps described for use with any role-playing system.

Reception
William A. Barton reviewed Grimtooth's Traps Too in The Space Gamer No. 61. Barton commented that "Though a few might think the idea is stretching thin after two volumes, most GMs should find Traps Too useful for ideas to plague their players - who may want to buy it in self-defense and memorize its contents to know what to look out for. Either way, it's sure to enliven (endeaden?) RPG play."

References

Fantasy role-playing game supplements
Role-playing game supplements introduced in 1982